Keith Newstead (4 March 1956 - 8 November 2020) was an English automata maker. He was considered one of the most pre-eminent makers of automata in the United Kingdom.

His work was exhibited globally, including the Exploratorium, the Eden Project, and the Tokyo Toy Museum.

References

External links
 Home

English sculptors
1956 births
2020 deaths